An elliptic filter (also known as a Cauer filter, named after Wilhelm Cauer, or as a Zolotarev filter, after Yegor Zolotarev) is a signal processing filter with equalized ripple (equiripple) behavior in both the passband and the stopband. The amount of ripple in each band is independently adjustable, and no other filter of equal order can have a faster transition in gain between the passband and the stopband, for the given values of ripple (whether the ripple is equalized or not). Alternatively, one may give up the ability to adjust independently the passband and stopband ripple, and instead design a filter which is maximally insensitive to component variations.

As the ripple in the stopband approaches zero, the filter becomes a type I Chebyshev filter. As the ripple in the passband approaches zero, the filter becomes a type II Chebyshev filter and finally, as both ripple values approach zero, the filter becomes a Butterworth filter.

The gain of a lowpass elliptic filter as a function of angular frequency ω is given by:

where Rn is the nth-order elliptic rational function (sometimes known as a Chebyshev rational function) and

  is the cutoff frequency
 is the ripple factor
 is the selectivity factor

The value of the ripple factor specifies the passband ripple, while the combination of the ripple factor and the selectivity factor specify the stopband ripple.

Properties 

 In the passband, the elliptic rational function varies between zero and unity.
 In the stopband, the elliptic rational function varies between infinity and the discrimination factor  which is defined as:

 In the limit of  the elliptic rational function becomes a Chebyshev polynomial, and therefore the filter becomes a Chebyshev type I filter, with ripple factor ε

Poles and zeroes 

The zeroes of the gain of an elliptic filter will coincide with the poles of the elliptic rational function, which are derived in the article on elliptic rational functions.

The poles of the gain of an elliptic filter may be derived in a manner very similar to the derivation of the poles of the gain of a type I Chebyshev filter. For simplicity, assume that the cutoff frequency is equal to unity. The poles  of the gain of the elliptic filter will be the zeroes of the denominator of the gain. Using the complex frequency  this means that:

Defining  where cd() is the Jacobi elliptic cosine function and using the definition of the elliptic rational functions yields:

Solving for w

where the multiple values of the inverse cd() function are made explicit using the integer index m.

The poles of the elliptic gain function are then:

As is the case for the Chebyshev polynomials, this may be expressed in explicitly complex form 

For orders 1 and 2 we have

where

The nesting property of the elliptic rational functions can be used to build up higher order expressions for :

where .

Minimum Q-factor elliptic filters 

See .

Elliptic filters are generally specified by requiring a particular value for the passband ripple, stopband ripple and the sharpness of the cutoff. This will generally specify a minimum value of the filter order which must be used. Another design consideration is the sensitivity of the gain function to the values of the electronic components used to build the filter. This sensitivity is inversely proportional to the quality factor (Q-factor) of the poles of the transfer function of the filter. The Q-factor of a pole is defined as:

and is a measure of the influence of the pole on the gain function. For an elliptic filter, it happens that, for a given order, there exists a relationship between the ripple factor and selectivity factor which simultaneously minimizes the Q-factor of all poles in the transfer function:

This results in a filter which is maximally insensitive to component variations, but the ability to independently specify the passband and stopband ripples will be lost. For such filters, as the order increases, the ripple in both bands will decrease and the rate of cutoff will increase. If one decides to use a minimum-Q elliptic filter in order to achieve a particular minimum ripple in the filter bands along with a particular rate of cutoff, the order needed will generally be greater than the order one would otherwise need without the minimum-Q restriction. An image of the absolute value of the gain will look very much like the image in the previous section, except that the poles are arranged in a circle rather than an ellipse. They will not be evenly spaced and there will be zeroes on the ω axis, unlike the Butterworth filter, whose poles are arranged in an evenly spaced circle with no zeroes.

Comparison with other linear filters

Here is an image showing the elliptic filter next to other common kind of filters obtained with the same number of coefficients:

As is clear from the image, elliptic filters are sharper than all the others, but they show ripples on the whole bandwidth.

References 
 
 

Linear filters
Network synthesis filters
Electronic design